Paul Blake Gruber (born February 24, 1965) is an American former football offensive tackle in the National Football League. He was drafted by the Tampa Bay Buccaneers fourth overall in the 1988 NFL Draft. He played college football at Wisconsin.

Career
Gruber spent his entire National Football League career with the Tampa Bay Buccaneers from 1988 to 1999. He never missed a snap in his first five years in the league. Over his 12-year career he appeared in 183 games, starting all of them, which was a Buccaneers record until Derrick Brooks broke it in 2007.

For most of his career, Gruber was one of the few marquee players on a bad team; indeed, his early years were spent on some of the worst teams in Bucs history. The Bucs had losing records in each of his first nine seasons, including the last seven years of an NFL-record streak of 12-consecutive 10-loss seasons.

He missed the last part of the 1999 season, in which the Buccaneers advanced all the way to the NFC Championship Game, due to a broken leg.  The injury was slow to heal in the offseason, which was a factor in his decision to retire during the summer of 2000.

On June 6, 2012, it was announced that Paul Gruber will be the latest member of the Tampa Bay Buccaneer Ring of Honor. Gruber joined Hall of Famer Lee Roy Selmon, former coach John McKay and tight end Jimmie Giles as the fourth inductee into the Ring of Honor, established in 2009.

References

1965 births
Living people
Sportspeople from Madison, Wisconsin
American football offensive tackles
Wisconsin Badgers football players
Tampa Bay Buccaneers players
People from Prairie du Sac, Wisconsin
Players of American football from Wisconsin
Ed Block Courage Award recipients